Line 9 of the Guangzhou Metro is a rapid transit line running across the Huadu District. Line 9's color is pale green. Line 9 was opened for operation on 28 December 2017.

Opening timeline

Stations

Future expansion 
A  extension of line 9 is planned to Forest Park station from Fei'eling station.

References

09
Railway lines opened in 2017

1500 V DC railway electrification